Radina Tomova (Bulgarian: Радина Томова; born 2 December 2005) is a Bulgarian rhythmic gymnast. She won a gold medal in the group All-Around at the 2022 World Championships. And she is world champion with the Bulgarian team in the finals with 3 ribbons+2 balls in the world championship 2022 in Sofia.

Career 
Tomova switched from individuals to the national group in late summer 2022 to replace Vaya Draganova. On September 16, 2022 she, along her teammates Sofia Ivanova, Kamelia Petrova, Rachel Stoyanov,, Zhenina Trashlieva, Margarita Vasileva, won gold in the group All-Around at the World Championships and got a spot for the 2024 Olympic Games in Paris.

References 

 

2005 births
Living people
Bulgarian rhythmic gymnasts
Medalists at the Rhythmic Gymnastics World Championships